Acanthocercus annectans, the Eritrean rock agama or Eritrean ridgeback agama, is a species of lizard in the family Agamidae. It is a small lizard found in Ethiopia, Kenya, Somalia, and Djibouti.

References

Acanthocercus
Reptiles described in 1870
Taxa named by William Thomas Blanford
Taxobox binomials not recognized by IUCN